Anna Monz  (born 8 December 1989) is a German handball player for HSG Blomberg-Lippe and the German national team.

She was selected as part of the German team for the 2017 World Women's Handball Championship.

References

External links

1989 births
Living people
German female handball players
People from Burghausen, Altötting
Sportspeople from Upper Bavaria